The 2011 CONCACAF U-17 Championship qualification tournaments took place in 2010 to qualify national teams for the 2011 CONCACAF U-17 Championship.

Caribbean zone
The first round group winners advanced to a second group phase along with Cuba, Haiti, and group hosts Trinidad and Tobago and Dominican Republic. In the second round, the top two finishers in each group, along with the best-ranked third place side, qualified for the twelve-team 2011 CONCACAF U-17 Championship.

First round

Group A

Group B

Group C

Group D

Final round

Group E

Group F

Group F was originally scheduled to be played in Jamaica, but the matches were postponed. It was later announced that the Dominican Republic would host the group.

Central American zone

Group A

Group B

Playoff

Guatemala advanced to 2011 CONCACAF U-17 Championship.

References

Qual
CONCACAF U-17 Championship qualification